Poecilasthena anthodes is a moth of the  family Geometridae. It is found in Queensland, Victoria, Western Australia and Tasmania.

References

External links
Australian Faunal Directory
Australian Insects

Moths of Australia
Moths described in 1891
Poecilasthena